WGHR may refer to two radio stations in the United States:

 WGHR (FM) 106.3, a commercial station licensed to serve Spring Hill, Florida, using the callsign since 2014
 WGHR (Georgia), an FM station in Marietta, Georgia (1981–2001) and via Internet continuously since then